Noureddine Saâdi (6 May 1950 – 20 July 2021) was an Algerian football manager who was managing JSM Béjaïa in the Algerian Ligue Professionnelle 1. He coached many major clubs in Algeria, as well as clubs in Libya and the United Arab Emirates. He was also a member of Algeria's coaching staff at the 1990 African Cup of Nations.

Saadi died from COVID-19 in 2021, during the COVID-19 pandemic in Algeria.

Managerial career
On 7 September 2011, Saâdi was appointed the coach of defending Algerian Ligue Professionnelle 1 champions ASO Chlef.

References

1950 births
2021 deaths
Berber Algerians
Algerian football managers
JS Kabylie managers
USM Alger managers
Al-Qadisiyah FC managers
MC Alger managers
MO Béjaïa managers
ES Sétif managers
ASO Chlef managers
Al-Ahli SC (Tripoli) managers
Club Athlétique Bizertin managers
JSM Béjaïa managers
Expatriate football managers in Saudi Arabia
Expatriate football managers in the United Arab Emirates
Expatriate football managers in Libya
Expatriate football managers in Tunisia
Algerian expatriate sportspeople in Saudi Arabia
Algerian expatriate sportspeople in the United Arab Emirates
Algerian expatriate sportspeople in Libya
Algerian expatriate sportspeople in Tunisia
Algerian Ligue Professionnelle 1 managers
Tunisian Ligue Professionnelle 1 managers
Saudi First Division League managers
Deaths from the COVID-19 pandemic in Algeria
21st-century Algerian people